Isaac Baron (born July 10, 1987) an American professional poker player from Menlo Park, California. He was the winner of the first Card Player Magazine Online Poker Player of the Year Award in 2007.

Poker

Online poker
Playing under the screen names of "westmenloAA" on PokerStars and "Isaac Baron" on Full Tilt Poker, Baron's online winnings exceeded $1,000,000 in 2007, including a win in the PokerStars weekly Sunday Million tournament in January for $254,000. He has also been able to translate his online success to live games. At a time when he was unable to play tournaments in the United States because of his age, he cashed four times in World Poker Tour and two European Poker Tour events held outside of the U.S.

Full Tilt Online Poker Series (FTOPS) 
Baron under the screen name "the guru 11," won the first event of FTOPS VIII on May 8, 2008, earning $158,852.

European Poker Tour
On April 4, At the 2008 European Poker Tour (EPT) San Remo, Baron cashed in his first EPT  after being eliminated in 11th place by Dario Minieri.

On April 17, At the 2008 PokerStars.com EPT Grand Final in Monte Carlo, Baron made the final table finishing in 4th place. He exited the tournament holding AQ against eventual winner Glen Chorney's pocket aces, he picked himself up €589,000 ($932,692) for his efforts.

As of 2012, his total live tournament winnings exceed $2,600,000.

World Series of Poker Bracelets

References

External links 
  Cardplayer.com - Online Poker: Interview With Isaac 'westmenloAA' Baron
 BluffMagazine.com - Interview with Isaac Baron

American poker players
1987 births
World Series of Poker bracelet winners
Living people
People from Menlo Park, California